An official gazette is a public journal.

Official Gazette may also refer to:

 Official Gazette (Barbados)
 Official Gazette (Oman)
 Official Gazette (Philippines)
 Official Gazette (South Yemen)
 Official Gazette of Bosnia and Herzegovina
 Official Gazette of Iraq
 Official Gazette of the Federation (Mexico)
 Official Gazette of the Republic of Tunisia
 Official Gazette of the Republic of Turkey
 Official Gazette The Bahamas
 The Official Gazette of Guyana
 Trademark Official Gazette, of the United States Patent and Trademark Office

See also
 Gazzetta Ufficiale, Italy
 List of government gazettes